Breusch is a surname. Notable people with the surname include:

Robert Breusch (1907–1995), German-American number theorist 
Trevor S. Breusch (born  1953), Australian professor

See also
Breusch–Godfrey test, a statistics test 
Breusch–Pagan test, a statistics test